CESAER is a non-profit association of universities of science and technology in Europe. CESAER was founded on 10 May 1990, seated in the Castle of Arenberg in Leuven, Belgium. The association has 58 universities of science and technology in 28 countries. The name CESAER was formed as an abbreviation for "Conference of European Schools for Advanced Engineering Education and Research", but today only the short form CESAER is used.

The combined member institutions of the association have over 1.1 million students enrolled and employ over 96,000 academic staff. The current President until end of 2023 is Rik Van de Walle, Rector of Ghent University.

Members
The most up-to-date list of Members of CESAER is provided at https://www.cesaer.org/members/

References

External links
Official website

College and university associations and consortia in Europe
Engineering university associations and consortia
Leuven
Organisations based in Flemish Brabant
Technology consortia